Through Hell and High Water is a BBC television programme produced by Twofour that aired in the United Kingdom on 1317 February 2006. Five half-hour morning programmes (9:3010am) on BBC1 followed James Cracknell (Olympic rower) and Ben Fogle (television presenter) in their attempt to cross the Atlantic Ocean in "Spirit of EDF Energy", a 24-foot rowing boat, with a half-hour summary programme during the evening of the final day on BBC2.

Cracknell and Fogle were competing in the 20052006 Atlantic Rowing Race. They were the third boat (two fours boats finished ahead of them) and the first pairs boat to cross the finishing line. They were later moved to second place for drinking their emergency water supply in accordance with the race rules. They finished in Antigua at 7:13am GMT on 19 January 2006, with a crossing time of 49 days, 19 hours, 8 minutes.

It won a Royal Television Society award for best daytime programme.

References

External links
 
 
 Atlantic Rowing Race

2006 British television series debuts
2006 British television series endings
BBC television documentaries
Rowing in the United Kingdom
2006 in British television
Documentary films about sportspeople
English-language television shows
Ocean rowing
British sports documentary films